is a Japanese monthly literary magazine published in Japan.

History and profile
Gunzō was first published in October 1946 as  oriented publication. The magazine is published by Kodansha.

The past contributors for the magazine include: Kenzaburō Ōe, Haruki Murakami and Yoriko Shono. Along with Shinchō, Bungakukai, Subaru and Bungei  magazines, Gunzō is among the leading thick literary magazines in Japan.

Gunzō is also aimed at discovering new talent, both among writers and critics. It runs the annual Gunzo Prize for New Writers, and provides informational support for the Noma Prize. It had a policy of running stories anonymously to encourage people not to read stories for the name of the author.

References

External links
 Official website

1946 establishments in Japan
Literary magazines published in Japan
Monthly magazines published in Japan
Kodansha magazines
Magazines established in 1946